The 1937 Coronation Honours were awarded in honour of the coronation of George VI.

Royal Honours

Order of the Thistle
 The Queen

Royal Victorian Chain
 The Queen
 Queen Mary
 Clive, Baron Wigram

Royal Victorian Order (GCVO)
 The Queen of Norway
 Mary, Princess Royal and Countess of Harewood
 Princess Louise, Duchess of Argyll
 Princess Beatrice

Order of the British Empire (GBE)
 The Duchess of Gloucester
 The Duchess of Kent
 Princess Alice, Countess of Athlone

Privy Council
 The Duke of Kent
 Edward Leslie Burgin, MP for Luton

Peerages

Earldoms
 Vere Brabazon, Earl of Bessborough, GCMG
 Claude George, Earl of Strathmore and Kinghorne, KT, GCVO, TD

Viscountcies
 Sir Robert Stevenson Horne, GBE, KC, MP
 Sir Herbert Louis Samuel, GCB, GBE, MP

Baronies
 Christopher Addison, MD, FRCS, MP
 Sir George Bowyer, Bt., MC, DL, MP
 Sir John Cadman, GCMG
 Admiral of the Fleet Sir Alfred Ernle Montacute Chatfield, GCB, KCMG, CVO
 Julius Salter Elias
 Colonel John Cuthbert Denison-Pender, MP
 Sir Frederick George Penny, Bt., JP, MP
 Sir Walter Russell Rea, Bt.
 Sir John Davenport Siddeley, CBE

Knights/Ladies of the Order of the Garter (KG/LG)
 Captain His Grace Bernard Marmaduke, Duke of Norfolk
 Henry Hugh Arthur Fitzroy, Duke of Beaufort, GCVO (additional Knight)
 William Thomas Brownlow, Marquess of Exeter, CMG, TD
 Claude George, Earl of Strathmore and Kinghorne, KT, GCVO, TD (additional Knight)

Knights/Ladies of the Order of the Thistle (KT/LT)
 Lieutenant-Colonel John James Hamilton, Earl of Stair, DSO
 Sir Iain Colquhoun, Bt., DSO

Privy Counsellors
 Edward Leslie Burgin, MP
 Sir Felix Cassel, Bt., KC
 Colonel Sir George Loyd Courthope, Bt., MC, JP, DL, MP
 Sir Patrick Duncan, GCMG, Governor-General of the Union of South Africa
 Isaac Foot, MP
 Viscount Galway, GCMG, DSO, OBE Governor-General of New Zealand
 Brigadier Baron Gowrie, GCMG, CB, DSO, Governor-General of Australia
 Ernest Lapointe, KC
 Frederick William Pethick-Lawrence, MP
 Sir Robert William Hugh O'Neill, Bt., MP
 Lord Snell, CBE, JP, MP
 Lord Tweedsmuir, GCMG, CH, Governor-General of Canada

Baronetcies
 Sir Richard Dawson Bates, OBE, DL, MP
 Captain Sir William Edge, JP, MP
 Major Sir Sir George Hamilton, 1st Baronet, JP, MP
 Commander Archibald Richard James Southby, JP, DL, MP
 Sir Cuthbert Sidney Wallace, KCMG, CB, FRCS, LRCP
 Sir David Milne-Watson, DL
 Sir Robert Eaton White, VD, DL

Knighthood
Captain Thomas Noel Arkell. For political and public services in Swindon, Wiltshire.
The Right Honourable Anthony Brutus Babington, K.C., M.P., Attorney-General, Northern Ireland.
Arnold Edward Trevor Bax, Esq., D.Mus. For services to music.
John Bennett, Esq., Vice-Chancellor of the Court of the County Palatine of Lancaster.
Henry Berney, Esq., J.P., D.L. For political and public services in Croydon.
Archibald Campbell Black, Esq., O.B.E., K.C., Procurator to the General Assembly of the Church of Scotland since 1935.
Maurice Bloch, Esq., J.P. For political and public services in Glasgow.
Muirhead Bone, Esq., LL.D. For services to art.
Paul Malone Booth, Esq., Chairman of the Management Committee of the National Liberal Club. For political and public services.
William Bradshaw, Esq., J.P., President of the Co-operative Wholesale Society.
Clement Edmund Royds Brocklebank, Esq., M.P., Member of Parliament for the Fairfield division of Liverpool since 1931 and for East Nottingham 1924 to 1929. For political and public services.
George Frederick Clucas, Esq., C.B.E., Speaker of the House of Keys, Isle of Man.
Lieutenant-Colonel William Thomas Cox, D.S.O. For public and philanthropic services.
Robert William Dalton, Esq., C.M.G., His Majesty's Senior Trade Commissioner in Australia.
Hubert Arthur Dowson, Esq., Solicitor of Nottingham. President of the Law Society.
Oscar Follett Dowson, Esq., C.B.E., Legal Adviser, Home Office.
David Rowland Evans, Esq., General Secretary of the Liberal National Organisation. For political and public services.
Frank Fletcher, Esq., formerly Master of Marlborough College and Headmaster of Charterhouse School.
Colonel Edmund Vivian Gabriel, C.S.I., C.M.G., C.V.O., C.B.E. Gentleman Usher to His Majesty The King.
Charles Granville Gibson, Esq., M.P., Member of Parliament for Pudsey and Otley since 1929. For political and public services.
Major Francis William Crewe Fetherston-Godley, O.B.E., D.L., chairman, National Executive Council of the British Legion.
Arthur Frederick Hurst, Esq., D.M., F.R.C.P., Senior Physician to Guy's Hospital.
Ernest James Johnson, Esq. For political and public services in Staffordshire.
Sidney Midlane Johnson, Esq., Secretary of the County Councils Association.
Charles Sydney Jones, Esq., Pro-Chancellor of Liverpool University. For public services.
Henry Haydn Jones, Esq., M.P., Member of Parliament for Merioneth since 1910. For political and public services.
Colonel John James Jones, V.D., J.P., D.L. For public and philanthropic services in Wales.
Thomas William Miller-Jones, Esq. For political and public services in the East End of London.
Percy John Luxton Kelland, Esq., M.R.C.V.S., Chief Veterinary Officer, Ministry of Agriculture and Fisheries.
Alderman Harold Vaughan Kenyon, M.B.E., J.P. For political and public services in West London.
Robert McDougall, Esq., J.P. For public and philanthropic services, especially to the National Trust.
Gilbert McIlquham, Esq., J.P. For political and public services in Gloucestershire.
William Marchbank Marshall, Esq. For political and public services in Scotland.
Commodore Charles George Matheson, D.S.O., R.D., R.N.R. (Retired), Commodore, Orient Steam Navigation Company.
Allen Mawer, Esq., Litt.D., F.B.A., Provost of University College, London. Director of Survey of English Place Names.
Lieutenant-Colonel Thomas Cecil Russell Moore, C.B.E., M.P., Member of Parliament for the Ayr Burghs since June, 1925. For political and public services.
George Morley, Esq., C.B.E., Chief Constable of Durham.
Judge Allan George Mossop, Judge of His Majesty's Supreme Court for China.
John Niven, Esq., Chairman of the Baltic Mercantile and Shipping Exchange.
Robert Howson Pickard, Esq., D.Sc., Ph.D., F.R.S., F.I.C., Director of the British Cotton Industry Research Association.
Alexander West Russell, Esq., M.P., Member of Parliament for Tynemouth since November, 1922. For political and public services.
Joshua Scholefield, Esq., K.C., Chairman of the Railway Assessment Authority. President, London Passenger Transport Arbitration Tribunal.
Harry Bertram Shackleton, Esq., Chairman of the Wool Textile Delegation. President of the Wool and Worsted Trades Federation.
Major Reginald Hugh Dorman-Smith, J.P., M.P., President of the National Farmers' Union.
Major Thomas Gabriel Lumley Lumley-Smith, D.S.O., F.S.A., Grand Secretary of Mark Master Masons.
Louis Saul Sterling, Esq. For political and public services.
John Taylor, Esq. For political and public services in Blackburn.
Professor D'Arcy Wentworth Thompson, C.B.,D.Litt., D.Sc., LL.D., F.R.S., F.R.S.E., Professor of Natural History, University of St. Andrews.
Sylvanus Percival Vivian, Esq., C.B., Registrar-General in England and Wales.
Hugh Seymour Walpole, Esq., C.B.E. For services to literature.
Pelham Francis Warner, Esq., M.B.E. For services to sport.
Harold Beckwith Whitehouse, Esq., M.B., M.S., F.R.C.S., Professor of Midwifery and Diseases of Women, University of Birmingham.
William Valentine Wood, Esq., Senior Vice-president of the Executive of the London Midland and Scottish Railway Company.
Captain William Henry Laycock Wordsworth, J.P. For political and public services in the North Riding of Yorkshire.

Dominions.

Henry Chapman, Esq., C.B.E., Resident Director and General Manager of the Rhodesian Railway Companies.
Robert William Chapman, Esq., C.M.G., Professor of Engineering, University of Adelaide, State of South Australia. For public services.
William James Clemens, Esq., C.M.G., I.S.O., Commissioner, Public Service Board, Commonwealth of Australia.
Samuel Sydney Cohen, Esq. For public services in the State of New South Wales.
Major the Honourable Henry Alan Currie, M.C., Member of the Legislative Council, State of Victoria. For public services.
Ernest Davis, Esq., Mayor of the City of Auckland, Dominion of New Zealand.
Ernest Thomas Fisk, Esq., A.M.I.E. (Aust.). For public services in the State of New South Wales.
Charles John Boyd Norwood, Esq. For public services in the Dominion of New Zealand.
James Wallace Sandford, Esq. For public services in the Commonwealth of Australia.
The Honourable Alexander George Wales, J.P., Lord Mayor of the City of Melbourne, State of Victoria.

India.

M. R. Ry. Diwan Bahadur Subbarayalu Kumaraswami Reddiyar Avargal, lately Minister for Education and Public Health to the Governor of Madras, Madras.
Rao Bahadur Chaudhuri Chhotu Ram, Member of the Punjab Legislative Assembly, Minister for Development to the Governor of the Punjab.
Idwal Geoffrey Lloyd, Esq., C.S.I., Indian Civil Service (retired), lately Member of the Executive Council of the Governor of Burma.
Robert Ernest Jack, Esq., Indian Civil Service, Puisne Judge of the High Court of Judicature at Fort William in Bengal.
Kenneth William Barlee, Esq., Barrister-at-Law, Indian Civil Service, Puisne Judge of the High Court of Judicature at Bombay, 
John Gibb Thorn, Esq., D.S.O., M.C., Puisne Judge of the High Court of Judicature at Allahabad, United Provinces.
Frederick Louis Grille, Esq., Barrister-at-Law, Indian Civil Service, Puisne Judge of the High Court of Judicature at Nagpur, Central Provinces.
George Richard Frederick Tottenham, Esq., C.S.I., C.I.E., Indian Civil Service, lately Secretary to the Government of India in the Defence Department.
Theodore James Tasker, Esq., C.I.E., O.B.E., Indian Civil Service, Revenue and Police Member, His Exalted Highness the Nizam's Government, Hyderabad, Deccan.
Kenneth Mclntyre Kemp, Esq., Barrister-at-Law, J.P., Advocate-General, Bombay.
Brigadier Harold John Couchman, D.S.O., M.C., R.E., Surveyor-General of India.
John Nesbitt Gordon Johnson, Esq., C.S.I., C.I.E., Indian Civil Service, lately Chief Commissioner of Delhi.
Seth Haji Abdoola Haroon, Member of the Central Legislative Assembly, Merchant, Sind.
Colonel Arthur Olver, C.B., C.M.G., F.R.C.V.S., F.N.L, Royal Army Veterinary Corps (retired), Expert Adviser in Animal Husbandry to the Imperial Council of Agricultural Research.
Colonel Edward Hearle Cole, C.B., C.M.G., Indian Army (retired), Landlord, Okara Punjab.
Thomas Howard Elderton, Esq., chairman, Calcutta Port Trust, Bengal.
Frank Birley, Esq., Member of the Madras Legislative Council, Director, Messrs. Best & Co., Ltd., Madras.
David Burnett Meek, Esq., C.I.E., O.B.E., Indian Educational Service, Indian Trade Commissioner in London.
Frank Herbert Brown, Esq., C.I.E., Honorary Secretary, East India Association, London.
Vivian Everard Donne Jarrad, Esq., Agent, Bengal-Nagpur Railway.
Narayan Vishvanath Mandlik, Esq., Advocate, Bombay.

Colonies, Protectorates, &c.

Waithilingam Duraiswamy, Esq., Speaker of the State Council, Ceylon.
Vandeleur Molyneux Grayburn, Esq. For public services in Hong Kong.
Arthur Edwin Horn, Esq., C.M.G., M.D., M.R.C.P., Consulting Physician to the Colonial Office.
George Frederick Huggins, Esq., O.B.E. For public services in Trinidad.
Charles Ewan Law, Esq., Colonial Legal Service, Chief Justice, Zanzibar.
George William Arthur Trimmer, Esq., M.I.C.E., M.I.M.E., M.Inst.T., chairman and General Manager of the Singapore and Penang Harbour Boards, Straits Settlements.
Armigel de Vins Wade, Esq., C.M.G., O.B.E., Colonial Administrative Service, Colonial Secretary, Kenya.

Order of the Bath

Knights/Dames Grand Cross (GCB)

Military
 General Sir John Theodosius Burnett-Stuart, KCB, KBE, CMG, DSO
 General Sir Hubert de la Poer Gough, GCMG, KCB, KCVO
 Air Chief Marshal Sir John Miles Steel, KCB, KBE, CMG

Civil
 Sir Isaac Alfred Isaacs, GCMG, former Governor-General of Australia
 Sir Horace John Wilson, GCMG, KCB, CBE

Knights/Dames Commander (KCB/DCB)

Military
 Vice-Admiral Sir Geoffrey Blake, CB, DSO
 Vice-Admiral Sir Alexander Ramsay, KCVO, CB, DSO
 Lieutenant-General Sir Robert Gordon-Finlayson, CB, CMG, DSO
 Lieutenant-General Sir John Dill, CB, CMG, DSO
 Lieutenant-General Sir Henry Karslake, KCSI, CB, CMG, DSO
 Major-General (Indian Army) Sir Roger Wilson, CB, DSO, MC
 Air Marshal Sir Wilfrid Freeman, CB, DSO, MC

Civil
 Lieutenant-Colonel George Augustus Anson, CBE, MVO
 John Donald Balfour Fergusson, CB Permanent Secretary, Ministry of Agriculture and Fisheries
 Edgar John Forsdyke, FSA Director and Principal Librarian, British Museum
 Sir Thomas Robert Gardiner, KBE  Director General of the Post Office
 Edward Mellanby, FRCP, FRS  Secretary, Medical Research Council
 Sir James Rae Under  Secretary,  H.M. Treasury.
 Sir Godfrey John Vignoles Thomas, Bt., KCVO, CSI  Private Secretary to H.R.H. The Duke of Gloucester.
 Sir Gerald Woods Wollaston, KCVO   Garter Principal King of Arms

Companions (CB)

Military
 Rear-Admiral Francis Thomas Butler Tower, OBE
 Rear-Admiral Alfred Englefield Evans, OBE
 Rear-Admiral John Henry Dacres Cunningham, MVO
 Rear-Admiral Edward Rupert Drummond, MVO
 Rear-Admiral Herbert Fitzherbert, CMG
 Engineer Rear-Admiral Augustus George Crousaz
 Surgeon Rear-Admiral Guy Leslie Buckeridge, OBE, MRCS, LRCP, KHS
 Paymaster Rear-Admiral Arthur Foster Strickland, OBE
 Archdeacon Arthur Deane Gilbertson, OBE
 Colonel-Commandant Alan George Barwys Bourne, DSO, MVO
 Captain Arthur Goodall Maundrell, CIE, RIN
 Major-General Osburne Ievers, DSO
 Major-General Francis Stewart Gilderoy Piggott, DSO
 Major-General Henry Marrian Joseph Perry, OBE
 Major-General Algernon Philip Yorke Langhorne, DSO, MC
 Major-General Ernest Cyril Gepp, DSO
 Major General Viscount Gort, VC, CBE, DSO, MVO, MC
 Major-General Ernest Ker Squires, DSO, MC
 Major-General Basil Alexander Hill, DSO
 Major-General Maxwell Spieker Brander, OBE
 Major-General Donald Kenneth McLeod, DSO
 Major-General William Haywood Hamilton, CIE, CBE, DSO, FRCS
 Major-General John Evelyn Duigan, DSO, MC
 Major-General Henry Augustus Lewis, CBE
 Colonel (Temp. Brigadier) Arthur Francis Gore Perry Knox-Gore, DSO
 Colonel (Local Major-General) Robert Ferguson Lock
 Colonel (Hon. Brigadier) Christopher George Ling, DSO, MC
 Colonel James Aubrey Smith, CMG
Air Vice-Marshal Arthur Sheridan Barratt, C.M.G., M.C., Royal Air Force.
Air Vice-Marshal Ernest Leslie Gossage, D.S.O., M.C., Royal Air Force.
Air Commodore Albert Victor John Richardson, O.B.E., M.B., B.Ch., D.P.H., K.H.S., Royal Air Force.

Civil
 Charles Seymour Wright, OBE, MC
Major-General Henry Augustus Lewis, C.B.E. (late Royal Artillery), Director of Artillery, the War Office.
Honorary Colonel George, Baron Rochdale, President, Territorial Army and Air Force Association of the County of Middlesex.
Honorary Colonel Sir Henry William Cameron-Ramsay-Fairfax-Lucy, Bt., chairman, Territorial Army and Air Force Association of the County of Warwick.
Colonel Leonard Green, M.C., T.D., Territorial Army, Commander, 125th (Lancashire Fusiliers) Infantry Brigade.
David Randall Pye, Esq., M.A., Sc.D., M.I.Mech.E., F.R.Ae.S., Director of Scientific Research, Air Ministry.
Walter Raymond Birchall, Esq., Deputy Director-General, General Post Office.
William John Braithwaite, Esq., Commissioner for the Special Purposes of the Income Tax Acts.
John Ainsworth Dale, Esq., C.B.E., Principal Assistant Secretary, Ministry of Labour.
John Harry Hebb, Esq., C.B.E., M.B., B.Ch.; Director-General of Medical Services, Ministry of Pensions.
Algar Henry Stafford Howard, Esq., C.V.O., Norroy King of Arms and Principal Herald of the North Part of England.
Alan Frederick Lascelles, Esq., C.M.G., M.V.O., M.C., Assistant Private Secretary to His Majesty The King.
Francis William Lascelles, Esq., M.C., Principal Clerk of Public Bills, House of Lords.
Cecil Winton Maudslay, Esq., Principal Assistant Secretary, Board of Education.
Bernard Rackham, Esq., F.S.A., Keeper, Department of Ceramics, Victoria and Albert Museum.
George Thomas Reid, Esq., Principal Assistant Secretary, Unemployment Assistance Board.
Lieutenant-Colonel Frederic Newell Westbury, O.B.E., M.C., Regional Director, Scottish Region, General Post Office.

Order of Merit (OM)
Lieutenant-General the Lord Baden-Powell, GCMG, GCVO, KCB

Order of the Star of India

Knights Grand Commander (GCSI)
the Maharaja of Jind, GCIE, KCSI

Knights Commander (KCSI)
Kanwar Sir Jagdish Prasad, CSI, CIE, OBE
Sir Muhammad Zafarullah Khan
Mir Sir Muhammad Nazim Khan, the Mir of Hunza, KCIE

Companions (CSI)
Claude Henry Gidney, Esq., C.I.E., Indian Political Service, Officiating Resident at Hyderabad.
Vice-Admiral Arthur Edward Frederick Bedford, C.B., Flag Officer Commanding, The Royal Indian Navy.
Hugh Dow, Esq., C.I.E., Indian Civil Service, Secretary to the Government of India in the Commerce Department.
Arthur Cunningham Lothian, Esq., C.I.E., Indian Political Service, Additional Secretary to the Crown Representative.
Henry Joseph Twynam, Esq., C.I.E., Indian Civil Service, lately Officiating Chief Secretary to the Government of Bengal.
Major-General Edward Merivale Steward, C.B., O.B.E., Indian Army, Director of Supplies and Transport, Army Headquarters, India.
Major-General Hugh Francis Edward MacMahon, C.B., C.B.E., M.C., Indian Army, Deputy Adjutant and Quartermaster-General, Northern Command.
M. R. Ry. Diwan Bahadur Narsimha Ayyangar Gopalaswami Ayyangar Avargal, C.I.E., lately Member, Board of Revenue, Madras.
William Bailie Brett, Esq., C.I.E., Indian Civil Service, Chief Secretary to the Government of Bihar.
Clement Wansbrough Gwynne, Esq., C.I.E., O.B.E., Indian Civil Service, Chief Secretary to the Government of the United Provinces.
Charles Francis Waterfall, Esq., C.I.E., Indian Civil Service, Chief Secretary to the Government of the Central Provinces.
John William Smyth, Esq., C.I.E., Indian Civil Service, Commissioner, Central Division, Bombay.
Charles Frederick Grant, Esq., Indian Civil Service (retired), lately Commissioner, Burma

Order of St Michael and St George

Knights Grand Cross (GCMG)
Sir William Henry Clark, KCSI, KCMG – His Majesty's High Commissioner for Basutoland, the Bechuanaland Protectorate and Swaziland.
Sir Robert Randolph Garran, KCMG, KC. For public services in the Commonwealth of Australia.
The Right Honourable Sir Michael Myers, KCMG – Chief Justice, Dominion of New Zealand.
Sir Bernard Henry Bourdillon, K.C.M.G., K.B.E., Governor and Commander-in-Chief of the Colony and Protectorate of Nigeria.
The Right Honourable Sir Percy Lyham Loraine, Bt., K.C.M.G., His Majesty's Ambassador Extraordinary and Plenipotentiary at Angora.
Sir Frederick William Leith-Ross, K.C.B., K.C.M.G., Chief Economic Adviser to His Majesty's Government.

Knights Commander (KCMG)
Sir David Thomas Chadwick, CSI, CIE – Secretary of the Imperial Economic Committee and of the Executive Council of the Imperial Agricultural Bureaux.
The Honourable Sir Frederick Wollaston Mann, LLM – Lieutenant-Governor and Chief Justice of the State of Victoria.
Algernon Phillips Withiel Thomas – Emeritus Professor, Auckland University College, Dominion of New Zealand. For services to education.
Sir John Caulcutt. For services to the Colonial Office and to the Colonies in regard to currency and banking problems.
Lieutenant-Colonel Charles Henry Fortnom Cox, C.M.G., D.S.O., R.A., British Resident, Trans-Jordan.
Sir Arthur Salisbury Lawrance, K.B.E., C.M.G., D.S.O., Governor and Commander-in-Chief of the Somaliland Protectorate.
Lieutenant-Colonel Lord Francis George Montagu-Douglas-Scott, D.S.O. For public services in Kenya.
William Barrowclough Brown, Esq., C.B., C.B.E., Second Secretary to the Board of Trade.
Cecil Francis Joseph Dormer, Esq., M.V.O., His Majesty's  Envoy Extraordinary and Minister Plenipotentiary at Oslo.
Norman King, Esq., C.M.G., His Majesty's Consul-General at Barcelona.
George Arthur Drostan Ogilvie-Forbes, Esq., C.M.G., Counsellor at His Majesty's Embassy at Berlin, until recently His Majesty's Chargé d'Affaires at Valencia.
William Henry Robinson, Esq., C.B.E., Assistant to the Principal Establishment Officer, Foreign Office.

Companions (CMG)
Edgar Layton Bean, Esq., LL.B., Parliamentary Draftsman, State of South Australia.
Kingsley Anketell Henderson, Esq., F.R.I.B.A., F.R.V.I.A. For public services in the Commonwealth of Australia.
Lieutenant-Colonel Frank Higginson, Chief Administrative Officer for Central Europe, Imperial War Graves Commission.
Robert Henry Hogg, Esq., O.B.E., M.B., President of the Branch in the Dominion of New Zealand of the British Medical Association.
Thomas Dwyer Kelly, Esq., Under-Secretary and Comptroller of Accounts, Treasury, State of New South Wales.
Lieutenant-Colonel the Honourable George Victor Lansell, V.D., Member of the Legislative Council, State of Victoria. For public and social welfare services.
Arthur Edgar Leighton, Esq., F.I.C., Controller-General of Munitions Supply, Commonwealth of Australia.
Moir Mackenzie, Esq., O.B.E., Manager of the  Empire Division, Federation of British Industries.
James Francis Murphy, Esq., Secretary, Department of Commerce, Commonwealth of Australia.
Harold Eddey Priestman, Esq., Administrative Secretary to the High Commissioner for Basutoland, the Bechuanaland Protectorate and Swaziland.
John Rigg, Esq. For services in connection with the Workers' Educational Association in the Dominion of New Zealand.
Captain the Honourable William Sidney Senior, M.C., Minister of Mines and Public Works, Southern Rhodesia.
Hugh Nimmo Tait, Esq., Assistant Secretary, Dominions Office.
Harrie Dalrymple Wood, Esq., LL.B., Prothonotary of the Supreme Court, State of New South Wales.
John Conrad Abraham, Esq., M.B.E., Colonial Administrative Service, Senior Provincial Commissioner, Nyasaland Protectorate.
Francis Noel Ashley, Esq., Colonial Administrative Service, Resident Commissioner, British Solomon Islands Protectorate.
Francis John Bagshawe, Esq., M.B.E., Colonial Administrative Service, Senior Provincial Commissioner, Tanganyika Territory.
William Bartley, Esq., M.B.E., Colonial Administrative Service, President, Municipal Commissioners, Singapore, Straits Settlements.
Cecil James Juxon Talbot Barton, Esq., O.B.E., Colonial Administrative Service, Colonial Secretary, Fiji.
Alexander John Findlay, Esq., M.A., B.Sc.  Colonial Agricultural Service, Director of Agriculture, Zanzibar.
Charles Joseph Jeffries, Esq., O.B.E., Assistant Secretary, Colonial Office.
John Edward Siegfried Merrick, Esq., O.B.E., Colonial Administrative Service, Chief Secretary, Uganda Protectorate.
John William Moir, Esq. An early pioneer in the Nyasaland Protectorate.
Hubert Ernest Newnham, Esq., V.D., Colonial Administrative Service, Principal Collector of Customs, and chairman, Colombo Port Commission, Ceylon.
Frederick John Salmon, Esq., M.C., Commissioner of Lands and Surveys, Palestine.
Norman Lockhart Smith, Esq., Colonial Administrative Service, Colonial Secretary, Hong Kong.
Arthur Hudson Stocks, Esq., Colonial Administrative Service, Provincial Commissioner, Sierra Leone.
Charles Francis Massy Swynnerton, Esq., Director of Tsetse Research, Tanganyika Territory.
Gerald Charles Whiteley, Esq., Colonial Administrative Service, Deputy Chief Secretary, Nigeria.
Charles Campbell Woolley, Esq., O.B.E., M.C., Colonial Administrative Service, Colonial Secretary, Jamaica.
Arthur Francis Aveling, Esq., C.B.E., Acting Counsellor at His Majesty's Embassy at Warsaw.
Sir Noel Hughes Havelock Charles, Bt., M.C., Counsellor at His Majesty's Embassy at Brussels.
Colonel The Honourable Bertram Aloysius Forbes, O.B.E., until recently Assistant Inspector-General, Egyptian  Army.
Donald St. Clair Gainer, Esq., O.B.E., His Majesty's Consul-General at Munich.
Oliver Charles Harvey, Esq., a Counsellor in the Foreign Office.
Robert George Howe, Esq., Counsellor at His Majesty's Embassy at Peking.
Walter St. Clair Howland Roberts, Esq., M.C.. an Acting Counsellor in the Foreign Office.
Patrick Stratford Scrivener, Esq., First Secretary at His Majesty's Embassy at Angora.
Frederick Watson, Esq., O.B.E., His Majesty's Consul-General at Philadelphia.

Royal Victorian Order

Dames Grand Cross (GCVO)
Evelyn Emily Mary, Duchess of Devonshire.
Nina Cecilia, Countess of Strathmore and Kinghorne.

Knights Grand Cross (GCVO)

Gilbert, Earl of Ancaster.
Field-Marshal Sir William Riddell Birdwood, Bt., G.C.B., G.C.S.L, G.C.M.G., C.I.E., D.S.O.
Lieutenant-General Sir George Sidney Clive, K.C.B., C.M.G., D.S.O.
Air Vice-Marshal Sir Philip Woolcott Game, G.B.E., K.C.B., K.C.M.G., D.S.O.
Major The Right Honourable Sir Alexander Henry Louis Hardinge, K.C.B., C.V.O., M.C.
The Most Reverend and Right Honourable Cosmo Gordon Lang, D.D., Archbishop of Canterbury.
The Right Honourable Sir John Allsebrook Simon, G.C.S.I., K.C.V.O., O.B.E., K.C., M.P.

Dames Commanders (DCVO)
Lady Helen Cynthia Colville.
Lady Helen Violet Graham.

Knights Commanders (KCVO)
Major James Ulick Francis Canning Alexander, C.M.G., C.V.O., O.B.E.
Colonel Sir John Atkins, K.C.M.G., M.B., F.R.C.S.
George Nevile Maltby Bland, Esq., C.M.G.
Major-General Bertram Norman Sergison-Brooke, C.B., C.M.G., D.S.O.
The Honourable Gerald Henry Crofton Chichester, C.V.O.
Brigadier-General Sir Smith Hill Child, Bt., C.B., C.M.G., C.V.O., D.S.O.
Arthur William Steuart Cochrane, Esq., C.V.O.
Sir Henry Walford Davies, C.V.O., O.B.E., Mus.Doc.
Major-General Alan John Hunter, C.B., C.M.G., D.S.O., M.C.
Robert Uchtred Eyre Knox, Esq., C.V.O., D.S.O.
Edward Howard Marsh, Esq., C.B., C.M.G., C.V.O. (dated 11 February 1937).
George Frederic Still, Esq., M.D., F.R.C.P. 
Lieutenant-Colonel Sir Hugh Stephenson Turnbull, K.B.E.

Commanders (CVO)
Colin Mackenzie Black, Esq., W.S.
The Honourable Lettice, Mrs. Geoffrey Bowlby.
Ernest Bullock, Esq., Mus.Doc., F.R.C.O.
Osmund Somers Cleverly, Esq.
James Eggar, Esq., C.B.E.
Colonel Lancelot Merivale Gibbs, D.S.O., M.C.
The Honourable Arthur Jared Palmer Howard.
Eric Cyril Egerton Leadbitter, Esq.
Lieutenant-Colonel the Honourable Piers Walter Legh, C.M.G., C.I.E., M.V.O., O.B.E.
Brigadier-General Robert Chaine Alexander McCalmont, D.S.O.
Percy Metcalfe, Esq.
Colonel William Kenyon Mitford, C.M.G.
Owen Frederick Morshead, Esq., D.S.O., M.V.O., M.C.
Lieutenant-Colonel Walter Gordon Neale, C.I.E.
Lieutenant-Colonel Terence Edmund Gascoigne Nugent, M.V.O., M.C.
Major Ronald Thomas Stanyforth, M.V.O., M.C.
John Everard Stephenson, Esq., O.B.E.
Norman Richard Coombe Warwick, Esq., M.V.O., O.B.E.
Miss Edith Margaret Watson, C.B.E.
Miss Dorothy Yorke.

Members of the Fourth Class (LVO)
Charles Lambert Bayne, Esq.
Miss Catherine Black, M.B.E., R.R.C.
Lieutenant the Honourable Thomas William Edward Coke.
Miss Rosina Davies, M.B.E., A.R.R.C.
Cyril Frederick Gamon, Esq.
Major Norman Wilmhurst Gwatkin.
Major George Frederick Thomas Hopkins, M.V.O., M.C.
Miss Cicely Howland, O.B.E.
Lionel Logue, Esq.
John Lowther, Esq.
Ivison Stevenson Macadam, Esq., C.B.E.
Charles Johns Mole, Esq., M.B.E.
Captain Hugh Donald Ross, M.C.
Captain Roy Dugdale Salmon, M.C.
Major Christopher Ronald Spear, M.C.
Henry Austin Strutt, Esq.
Lieutenant-Colonel Edward John Patteson Travis Walker, O.B.E.

Members of the Fifth Class (MVO)
William Arthur Chadwick, Esq.
Alfred William Evans, Esq.
Miss Helen Louisa Gardiner.
Henry William Francis Godley, Esq.
William Rose Jarvis, Esq.
Joseph Walter Jones, Esq.
John Thomas Lincoln Kendle, Esq.
Herbert William Kirk, Esq.
Charles Philip Waters, Esq.

Order of the Indian Empire

Knights Grand Commander (GCIE)

His Highness Maharao Raja Ishwari Singh Bahadur, Maharao Raja of Bundi, Rajputana.
Sir Herbert William Emerson, K.C.S.I., C.I.E., C.B.E., Indian Civil Service, Governor of the Punjab.

Knights Commander (KCIE)
Sir Charles Augustus Tegart, C.S.I., C.I.E., M.V.O., lately Member of the Council of India.
Sir Thomas Guthrie Russell, Chief Commissioner of Railways.
Raja Rao Bahadur Durjan Sal Singh, Raja of Khilchipur, Central India.
Maharawal Shri Indrasinghji Pratapsinghji, Raja of Bansda, Gujarat States.
Lieutenant-Colonel Trenchard Craven William Fowle, C.B.E., Indian Political Service, Political Resident in the Persian Gulf.
Geoffrey Pownall Burton, Esq., C.I.E., Indian Civil Service, lately Member of the Executive Council of the Governor of the Central Provinces.
Major-General Bertrand Richard Moberley, C.B., D.S.O., Indian Army, Commander, Lahore District.
Major-General Clement Arthur Milward, C.B., C.I.E., C.B.E., D.S.Q., Indian Army, Commander, Lucknow District.
Raja Sir Muhammad Ejaz Rasul Khan, C.S.I., of Jahangirabad, Bara Banki District, United Provinces.
Malik Sir Firoz Khan Noon, Barrister-at-Law, High Commissioner for India in London.

Companion (CIE)
Rai Bahadur Kanak Lal Barua, lately Minister for Local Self-Government to the Governor of Assam.
Colonel (Temporary Brigadier) Reginald Stuart Abbott, M.C., A.D.C., Indian Army, Commander, Kohat Brigade, India
Colonel (Honorary Brigadier) Philip William Lilian Broke-Smith, D.S.O., O.B.E., British Service (Retired List), lately Chief Engineer, Eastern Command, India.
Colonel (Temporary Brigadier) Hollis Martin Burrows, Indian Army, Commander, Ferozepore Brigade Area.
Colonel (Temporary Brigadier) William Elworthy Kidner, M.C., Chief Engineer, Eastern Command, lately Deputy Engineer-in-Chief (Works), Army Headquarters, India.
John Francis Blakiston, Esq., Director-General of Archaeology in India.
Eric Cecil Ansorge, Esq., Indian Civil Service, Commissioner of the Tirhut Division, Bihar.
James Downing Penny, Esq., Indian Civil Service, Officiating Commissioner, Rawalpindi Division, Punjab.
Donald Macfarlane Esq., M.Inst. C.E., Indian Service of Engineers, Chief Engineer and Secretary to the Government of the Punjab in the Public Works Department, Buildings and Roads Branch.
George Mabyn Ross, Esq., B.A.I., Indian Service of Engineers, Chief Engineer and Secretary to the Government of the North-West Frontier Province in the Public Works Department.
Arthur Allen Waugh, Esq., Indian Civil Service, Secretary to the Government of the United Provinces in the Revenue Department.
James Richard Blair, Esq., Indian Civil Service, Additional Secretary to the Government of Bengal in the Political Department.
Colonel John Taylor, D.S.O., M.D., V.H.S., Indian Medical Service, Director, Central Research Institute, Kasauli.
Group Captain Norman Howard Bottomley, A.F.C., Officer Commanding No. 1 (Indian) Group, Royal Air Force, India
Colonel Cecil Alexander Boyle, D.S.O., Indian Army, Adviser in Languages and Secretary, Board of Examiners, General Staff Branch, Army Headquarters, India.
John Mellor Bottomley, Esq., Indian Educational Service, Director of Public Instruction, Bengal.
Lieutenant-Colonel George Frederick Joseph Paterson, O.B.E., M.C., Indian Army (Supernumerary List), Director of Military Lands and Cantonments, Defence Department.
Frank Ware, (Esq., F.R.C.V.S., Officiating Expert Adviser in Animal Husbandry to the Imperial Council of Agricultural Research.
Lieutenant-Colonel Arnort Edward Joseph Connell McDowell, Indian Police, Inspector General of Police, Bihar.
Emil Athol Owen Perkin, Esq., Indian Police, Inspector-General of Police, Orissa.
Daniel Healy, Esq., Indian Police, InspectorGeneral of Police, Sind.
Lieutenant-Colonel John de la Hay Gordon, O.B.E., M.C., Indian Political Service.
Walter Robert George Smith, Esq., Barristerat-Law, Indian Police, Commissioner of Police, Bombay. 
Vyakarana Narahari Rao, Esq., Indian Audit and Accounts Service, Additional Deputy Secretary to the Crown Representative.
Frederick Sayers, Esq., Indian Police, Deputy Inspector-General of Police, Madras.
Lieutenant-Colonel Clive Newcomb, B.Ch., D.M. (Oxpn.), M.R.C.S. (Eng.), L.R.C.P. (Lond.), F.I.C., F.C.S., Indian Medical Service, Chemical Examiner to the Government of Madras, and Principal, Medical College, Madras.
Lieutenant-Colonel Ronald Herbert Candy, M.B., B.S. (Lond.), M.R.C.S. (Eng.), L.R.C.P. (Lond.), Indian Medical Service, Civil Surgeon, Poona, Bombay.
Khan Bahadur Maulvi Abdul Aziz, Indian Service of Engineers, Superintending Engineer, Public Works Department, Irrigation Branch, United Provinces.
Charles Holditch Bristow, Esq., J.P., Indian Civil Service, Secretary to the Governor of Bombay.
Samuel Harrison Yardley Oulsnam, Esq., M.C., Indian Civil Service, Reforms Officer to the Government of the Central Provinces.
Major Alfred Edward Cartmel, M.M.. Indian Army, Commandant, Northern Shan States Battalion, Burma Frontier Force, Lashio, Northern Shan States, Burma.
Basil Martin Sullivan, Esq., O.B.E., Specialist Officer in the Public Works Department, Superintending Architect, Architectural Circle, Punjab.
Charles William Ayers, Esq., Principal Inspector of Taxes, Board of Inland Revenue, Somerset House, London.
Ernest Muir, Esq, M.D., F.R.C.S. (Edin.), LL.D., General and Medical Secretary, British Empire Leprosy Relief Association.
John James Crosbie Paterson, Esq., Locomotive and Carriage Superintendent, Bombay, Baroda and Central India Railway, Bombay.
Maung Set, Indian Audit and Accounts Service, Commissioner, Rangoon Corporation, Burma.

Order of the British Empire

Knight Grand Cross (GBE) 
Military Division

Admiral Sir Frederic Charles Dreyer, K.C.B.,C.B.E.
General Sir Archibald Rice Cameron, K.C.B., C.M.G., Retired Pay, Colonel, The Black Watch (Royal Highland Regiment), late General Officer, Commanding-in-Chief, Scottish Command, and Governor of Edinburgh Castle.

Civil Division
Sir Ernest John Strohmenger, K.B.E., C.B., lately deputy chairman, Unemployment Assistance Board.
Lieutenant-Colonel His Highness Fakhr-ud-Daulah Nawab Sir-Muhammad Iftikhar Ali Khan Bahadur, Saulat Jang, K.C.I.E., Nawab of Jaora, Central India.

Dame Grand Cross (GBE)
Civil Division
Enid Muriel, Mrs. Lyons. For public services rendered in the Commonwealth of Australia.

Dames Commanders (DBE)
Civil Division
Mary, Mrs. Graham Browne, (Miss Marie Tempest). For services to the stage.
Geraldine Southall, Mrs. Cadbury, J.P. For public and philanthropic services in Birmingham.
Ellen Frances, Mrs. Pinsent, C.B.E., late Senior Commissioner, Board of Control.
Miss Violet Edith Wills. For public and philanthropic services.
Edith Muriel, Lady Anderson. For public and social welfare services in Newfoundland and the State of New South Wales.
Margaret, Baroness Strickland. For philanthropic services in Malta.

Knights Commanders (KBE)
Military Division

Vice-Admiral Henry John Studholme Brownrigg, C.B., D.S.O.
Vice-Admiral James Pipon, C.B., C.M.G., M.V.O., O.B.E. (Retired).
Major-General Horace de Courcy Martelli, C.B., D.S.O., late Royal Artillery, Lieutenant-Governor and Commanding The Troops, Jersey District.
Major-General Edward Nicholson Broadbent, C.B., C.M.G., D.S.O., late The King's Own Scottish Borderers, Lieutenant-Governor-and Commanding The Troops, Guernsey and Alderney District.
Major-General William James Norman Cooke-Collis, C.B., C.M.G., D.S.O., late The Royal Ulster Rifles, General Officer Commanding Northern Ireland District.
Major-General Andrew Jameson McCulloch, C.B., D.S.O., D.C.M., Colonel, The Highland Light Infantry - (City of Glasgow Regiment), Commander, 52nd (Lowland) Division, Scottish Command, late General Officer Commanding the Troops, Malta.
Air Vice-Marshal Alfred William Iredell, C.B., M.R.C.S., L.R.C.P., K.H.P., Royal Air Force.

Civil Division
James Sidney Barnes, Esq., C.B., O.B.E., Deputy Secretary, Admiralty.
Gerald Bain Canny, Esq., C.B., deputy chairman, Board of Inland Revenue.
Evelyn John Maude, Esq., C.B., Deputy Secretary, Ministry of Health.
James Stirling Ross, Esq., C.B., C.B.E., Deputy Secretary, Air Ministry.
Robert Vaughan, Esq. For political and public services in Merionethshire.
George Bernard Lomas-Walker, Esq. For political and public services in the West Riding of Yorkshire.
Henry Herbert Couzens, Esq., a British subject, until recently resident in Rio de Janeiro.
Colonel John Chappell Ward, C.M.G., C.I.E., D.S.O., M.B.E., Director of the Port of Basra and Director of Navigation, Iraqi Government.
The Honourable John Richards Harris, M.D., Minister of Public Instruction and Minister of Public Health, State of Victoria.
Sir James Gordon McDonald, O.B.E. For services to Southern Rhodesia.
John Sanderson, Esq. For services to the Commonwealth of Australia.
Sir Navroji Bapuji Saklatvala, C.I.E., Director, Messrs. Tata Sons, Ltd., Bombay.
Rao Bahadur Madhorao Ganesh Deshpande, C.B.E., chairman and managing director of the Central Provinces and Berar Provincial Co-operative Bank, Ltd., Nagpur, Central Provinces.
Nana Osei Agyeman Prempeh II, Asantehene, Gold Coast.
Raja Abdul Aziz ibni al-marhum Raja Musa, Raja Muda of Perak, Federated Malay States. (Honorary)
His Highness Daudi Chwa, K.C.M.G., Kabaka of Buganda, Uganda Protectorate. (Honorary)
His Highness Tengku Ismail, Tengku Mahkpta of Johore, Malay States. (Honorary)

Commanders (CBE)

Civil division
Madeline Pamela Constance Blanche, Alderman Mrs. Adeane, J.P. For public services in Cambridgeshire.
George Andrew, M.A., F.R.S.E., H.M. Senior Chief Inspector of Schools, Scottish Education Department.
Samuel Armstrong, J.P., a Member of the Wheat Commission, Past President of the Council of the National    Association of British and Irish Millers.
Robert Claude Ashby, Chairman of the Southampton Juvenile Organisations Committee.
George Percival Best, Assistant Commissioner of Crown Lands.
William Blackwood, J.P. For political and public services.
William Guy Nott-Bower, Assistant Under-Secretary for Mines.
Arthur Lyon Bowley, M.A.,Sc.D., D.Sc., F.B.A., Emeritus Professor of Statistics in the University of London.
Walter Carter, Assistant Secretary, Board of Trade.
Professor Edgar Leigh Collis, M.D., M.R.C.P.,M.R.C.S., J.P., Emeritus Professor of Preventive Medicine in the University of Wales.
George Carter Cossar, M.C., L.R.C.P.E.,L.R.C.S.E., L.R.F.P.S., Founder of the Todhills Farm Colony and the Craigielinn Training Farm for the training of boys in agriculture.
Alwyn Douglas Crow, O.B.E., Sc.D., F.Inst.P., Director of Ballistics Research, Research  Department, Royal  Arsenal, Woolwich.
Bernard Richard Meirion Darwin, For services to literature and sport.
Britannia Margaret, Lady Davies. For political and public services in Cardiff.
Milner Gray, M.P. for Mid-Beds, 1929–31. Parliamentary Secretary to the Ministry of Labour, 1931. For political and public services.
Oswald Allen Harker, Administrative Assistant, Foreign Office.
Walter Fred Harris, F.C.A., Chairman of the Fishing Vessels War Risks Compensation Committee.
Albert Edward Holmes, Secretary, Printing and Kindred Trades Federation. Joint Secretary of the Joint Industrial Council of the Printing and Allied Trades of Great Britain and Ireland
John Hutcheson, For political and public services in Roxburgh and Selkirk.
Professor Thomas Gwynn Jones, M.A.,.Professor of Welsh Literature, University College of Wales, Aberystwyih.
Alexander Boyne King, J.P. For political and public services in Glasgow. 
Alderman Ernest Lambert. For political and public services in the East Riding of Yorkshire.
Walter Sydney Liddall, J.P, M.P., M.P. for Lincoln. For political and public services.
Thomas Lochhead, C.A., Chief Accountant, British Broadcasting Corporation.
Hugh Latimer McCready, D.L., Chairman of the Loans Advisory Committee, Northern Ireland.
Commander (Acting Captain) Frederick William Mace, O.B.E., R.N.R. (Retired), Marine Surveyor and Water Bailiff to the Mersey Docks and Harbour Board.
Walter Alexander Magill, I.S.O., Secretary, Ministry of Home Affairs, Northern Ireland.
George Gillies Mennell, Secretary and Assistant Commissioner, Civil Service Commission.
Miss Mary Clara Sophia Neal, J.P. For services in connection with the revival of folk songs and dances.
Alderman Frank Nicholson, J.P., Chairman of the Sunderland Local Employment Committee.
John Reginald Jutsum Passmore, Chief Inspector of Training, Ministry of Labour.
John Ronald Peddie, M.B.E., D.Litt., Executive Officer, National Committee for the Training of Teachers in Scotland.
Charles William Reeve, chairman and managing director of the  Associated Equipment Company. For services to   the Air Ministry.
George Riddle, President of the Co-operative Congress.
Llewellyn Roberts,  M.I.Mar.E., a Chief  Engineer, Cunard White Star Steamship Company.
William Robert Locke Spence, General Secretary of the National Union of Seamen.
Robert Hill Tolerton, D.S.O., M.C., Assistant Secretary, Roads Department, Ministry of Transport.
Brigadier James Whitehead, C.M.G., D.S.O., Assistant Commissioner, Metropolitan Police.
Archibald Kennedy Wilson, Chief Constable of Liverpool.

Overseas
Robert Rowland Appleby, a British subject resident in New York.
Mary Ethel Winifred, Lady Barton, O.B.E., wife of Sir Sidney  Barton, until recently His Majesty's Minister at Addis Ababa.
The Reverend Douglas William Bruce, a British subject resident in Buenos Aires.
William Sherlock Dupree, a British subject resident in Hankow.
Miralai Arthur William Green Bey, until recently Governor of the Western Desert, Egyptian Frontier Districts  Administration.
Ralph Cornwallis Stevenson, His Majesty's Consul at Bilbao.

 Commonwealth
William James Carew, Secretary of the Commission of Government and Secretary for Home Affairs, Newfoundland.
George Stanley Colman, Member, Pastoral Research Council, Commonwealth of Australia.
Arthur Malcolm Eedy, President of the Insurance Institute, State of New South Wales.
Jessie Isabel, Mrs. Henderson. For social welfare services in the State of Victoria.
Te Puea Herangi, a Māori Princess of Ngāruawāhia, Dominion of New Zealand. For social welfare services.
Raymond Douglas Huish, For services to ex-servicemen in the Commonwealth of Australia.
Miss Celia Macdonald of the Isles, O.B.E. For services in connection with hospitality for Dominion students  in London.
James Perrins Major, M.D., B.S., Honorary Secretary of the Branch in the State of Victoria of the British Medical Association.
Henry Ernest Moston, Assistant Secretary, Department of Labour, Dominion of New Zealand.
Miss Gladys Sydney Pott, O.B.E. For services in connection with the settlement overseas of British women.
Robert Fitzroy Sanderson, Member of the Federal Advisory Committee on Eastern Trade, Commonwealth of Australia.
Captain Donald Petrie Simson,O.B.E., Honorary  Secretary, British Empire Service League
M. R. Ry. Bezwada Ramachandra Reddi Garu, lately President, Legislative Council, Madras.
Susil Chandra  Sen, Solicitor to the Central Government at Calcutta.
Khwaja Shahabuddin, Member of the Bengal Legislative Assembly, chairman, Dacca District Board, Bengal.
George Herman Raschen, Member of the Sind Legislative Assembly, chairman, Karachi Chamber of Commerce, Sind.
Harry Willoughby Oddin Taylor, O.B.E., A.C.G.I.,  A.M.I.C.E.,  Indian Service of Engineers, Superintending Engineer (Irrigation) and Joint Secretary to the Agent to the Governor-General in Baluchistan in the Public Works Department.
John Humphrey Blackwell, M.C., Manager of the Delhi Office, The Burma Shell Company of India, Ltd.
John  Maurice Kilburn, lately  chairman, Assam Branch of the Indian Tea Association, Assam.
Edgar Percy Stocker, Deputy  Managing Director, Imperial Bank of India
Lieutenant-Colonel Robert Deane, O.B.E., Colonial Police Service, Inspector-General of Police and  Superintendent of Prisons, Mauritius.
Lieutenant-Colonel George Cruickshank Griffiths, C.M.G. For public services in Kenya.
Lieutenant-Colonel Horace Cyril Benjamin Hickling, D.S.O., M.C. For public services in Trinidad.
Peter Sinclair Hunter, M.B., Municipal Health Officer, Singapore, Straits Settlements.
James Lochhead, O.B.E., M.D., F.R.C.S., Colonial Medical Service, Senior Medical Officer, Gibraltar.
Eric Olawolu Moore, For public services in Nigeria.
George Laurie Pile, For public services in Barbados.
Lieutenant-Colonel Cecil Rae. For public services in the Federated Malay States.
William Francis Stephens, For public services in Seychelles.
William Stewart, For public services in the Tanganyika Territory

Officers (OBE)

Members (MBE)

Companions of Honour

Nancy Witcher, Viscountess Astor,  Member of Parliament for the Sutton Division 
The Reverend Melbourn Evans Aubrey, Moderator of the Federal Council of the Evangelical Free Churches. General Secretary of the Baptist Union of Great Britain and Ireland
Miss Gwendoline Elizabeth Davies. For educational, social and philanthropic services in Wales
John Alfred Spender, Esq For services to literature and journalism
Charles Thomson Rees Wilson,  For services to experimental physics

Imperial Service Order

Kaisar-i-Hind

References

1937
1937 awards
1937 in the United Kingdom